Schinia biforma is a moth of the family Noctuidae. It is found in North America, including the states of Colorado, New Mexico, Oklahoma and Texas.

The wingspan is about 21 mm.

The larvae feed on Amblyolepis setigera.

External links
Images
Butterflies and Moths of North America

Schinia
Moths of North America
Moths described in 1906